Giannakis Giangoudakis (born 17 January 1959) is a retired Cypriot football defender.

References

1959 births
Living people
Cypriot footballers
Apollon Limassol FC players
Association football defenders
Cypriot First Division players
Cyprus international footballers